Peter Anthony Brock (born July 14, 1954) is a former center and guard who played twelve professional seasons with the National Football League (NFL)'s New England Patriots. Brock attended the University of Colorado. His younger brother Stan played with the Colorado Buffaloes and in the NFL.

Brock was the starting center 78 times, starting left guard 3 times, starting left tackle 6 times and the starting right guard once in the 154 regular season games that he played for the New England Patriots. He wore #58. He is a part of the New England Patriots 1980s All-Decade Team.

Brock won the Ed Block Courage Award in 1985. He currently works as the President of the New England Patriots Alumni and announces college football games. He has his own segment called "Brock's Breakdown" as part of the pre-game show on 98.5 FM, the Sports Hub in Boston; in 2001 he also replaced Gino Cappelletti as color analyst on the Patriots' radio network for the first eight games of that season because of illness to Cappelletti.

References

1954 births
Living people
Players of American football from Portland, Oregon
American football centers
American football offensive guards
Colorado Buffaloes football players
New England Patriots players
All-American college football players
Jesuit High School (Beaverton, Oregon) alumni
Ed Block Courage Award recipients